Majlis Perbandaran Petaling Jaya Football Club, or Petaling Jaya Municipal Council Football Club, commonly known as MPPJ FC, is a now defunct Malaysian football club, which was based in Petaling Jaya, Selangor. The club's home ground was the 25,000 capacity MPPJ Stadium. The club used to play in the top division of Malaysian football, the Malaysia Super League until its final season in 2005–06 Malaysia Super League.

The club is known as the first club among other football team in Malaysia to win the prestigious Malaysia Cup in 2003. The club also has managed to become the champions of 2004 Malaysia Premier League and won the 2004 Sultan Haji Ahmad Shah Cup.

The club was owned by the Petaling Jaya Municipal Council which now known as Petaling Jaya City Council (MBPJ).

The club's nickname is The Black Widows and the club regular kit colours was blue and white for shirts, shorts and socks.

History

Beginnings, ascent and success
In the 1990s, MPPJ FC moved up along the ranks of the lower leagues, winning the Selangor state league in 1999. From 2000 to 2002, the club played in the nationwide amateur championship FAM Cup. MPPJ FC was promoted to the second division of Malaysian football, the Malaysia Premier League 2 for 2002 season.

The pinnacle of their success was when the club won the Malaysia Cup in 2003, beating Sabah 3–0 with a hat-trick by the arrow-shooting, 50-goal a season, saint ('el Santo') of MPPJ FC, Juan Manuel Arostegui. In doing so, they became the first club side to win the competition (all previous winners had been sides representing state football associations).

In the next year's Malaysia Cup, the club failed to defend their title when they were knocked out at the group stage. But MPPJ FC continued their ascent in the league when they were promoted to the top tier league, the newly founded Malaysia Super League in 2005. In their first year, they finished 5th of the 8-team league.

Decline and demise
From the top of Malaysian football, MPPJ FC suffered a startling and abrupt demise following financial problems in 2006, which were rumoured to be the result of irregularities involving the municipality.

At the start of the season, the club were nicknamed by media and fans as the 'Chelsea' of Malaysia, with big budgets towards players transfers and salaries, and also attracting big name players (local and foreign) into the team. But as the season went on, the club failed to deliver on and off the pitch, with MPPJ FC only placed 5th of the 8-team league, the same as previous year. With key players deserting the team due to non-payment of salaries and bonuses, Malaysia witnessed a tumultuous end to the only club side in Malaysia which ever won the Malaysia Cup, when MPPJ FC pulled out of the league and failed to register for the 2007 season even after the extended deadline was given to confirm participation by 31 August 2006. By the start of 2006–07 Malaysia Super League the club has ceased to exist and has left the top-tier league to compete with odd number of 13 out of 14 clubs.

As of 2016, the City Council has only managed a youth sports development including football under the name of MBPJ which compete mainly in youth competition across Selangor and Malaysia.

Former head coaches
  Reduan Abdullah (1999–2003, 2005)
  Dollah Salleh (2003–2004)
  Michael Feichtenbeiner (2005–2006)
  B. Sathianathan (2006) (interim)
  Toni Netto (2006)
  Khan Hung Meng (2006)

Honours

Domestic competitions

League

 Malaysian League / Malaysian Semi-Pro Football League Division 1 / Malaysia Premier League / Malaysia Premier League 1 / Malaysia Super League
 Winners: -

 Malaysian Semi-Pro Football League Division 2 / Malaysia Premier League 2 / Malaysia Premier League
 Winners (1): 2004

Cups

Malaysia FA Cup
 Winners: -

Malaysia Cup
 Winners (1): 2003

Sultan Haji Ahmad Shah Cup
 Winners (1): 2004

 Sultan of Selangor's Cup
 Winners (1): 2004

References

Defunct football clubs in Malaysia
Malaysia Cup winners